Yukihiro Hashimoto (橋本行弘, Hashimoto Yukihiro, born 17 September 1965) is a Japanese former handball player who was a goalkeeper.

In 1988 he competed in the 1988 Summer Olympics. He later won three medals at the Asian Games: silver in 1990 in Beijing and in 1994 in Hiroshima and bronze in 1998 in Bangkok.

He also has been one of the best goalkeeper at the 1997 World Championship played in Japan and has then been the third choice in the election of the IHF World Player of the Year in 1997.

References

1965 births
Living people
Japanese male handball players
Olympic handball players of Japan
Handball players at the 1988 Summer Olympics
Asian Games medalists in handball
Handball players at the 1990 Asian Games
Handball players at the 1994 Asian Games
Handball players at the 1998 Asian Games
Asian Games silver medalists for Japan
Asian Games bronze medalists for Japan
Medalists at the 1990 Asian Games
Medalists at the 1994 Asian Games
Medalists at the 1998 Asian Games
20th-century Japanese people